The Leech is a 1921 American silent drama film directed by Herbert Hancock and starring Alexander Hall and Claire Whitney.

Cast
 Ray Howard as Teddy
 Alexander Hall as 	Bill
 Claire Whitney as 	Dorothy
 Katherine Leon as 	Ruth
 Ren Gennard as Joe Turner

References

Bibliography
 Connelly, Robert B. The Silents: Silent Feature Films, 1910-36, Volume 40, Issue 2. December Press, 1998.
 Munden, Kenneth White. The American Film Institute Catalog of Motion Pictures Produced in the United States, Part 1. University of California Press, 1997.

External links
 

1921 films
1921 drama films
1920s English-language films
American silent feature films
Silent American drama films
American black-and-white films
Selznick Pictures films
1920s American films